Joseph Anstice Rafferty (10 January 1911 – 14 June 2000) was an Australian politician.

He was born in Launceston in Tasmania, the son of schoolteacher Col. R. A. Rafferty and Sarah Rose Anne Plummer. He was educated locally at both state and private schools and entered the public service in 1930. On 8 June 1940 he married Miriam Kathleen Richards, with whom he had two sons. He studied at the University of Tasmania, where he received a Bachelor of Arts in 1941. He had moved to Melbourne in 1940, where he studied law at the University of Melbourne. From 1945 he was personnel manager for Australian National Airways. A Liberal Party member, he was elected to the Victorian Legislative Assembly in 1955 as the member for Caulfield. He transferred to Ormond in 1958 and to Glenhuntly in 1967. In 1970 he was appointed Assistant Minister of Education (until 1972) as well as Minister of Labour and Industry. In 1973 he was further appointed Minister for Consumer Affairs, and in 1975 Minister for Federal Affairs. In 1976 he relinquished his previous portfolios to become Minister for Transport, a position he held until 1978. He was Chief Secretary until his retirement in 1979 to become Agent-General in London. Rafferty died in 2000.

References

1911 births
2000 deaths
Liberal Party of Australia members of the Parliament of Victoria
Members of the Victorian Legislative Assembly
20th-century Australian politicians
Politicians from Launceston, Tasmania
University of Tasmania alumni
University of Melbourne alumni